Misericordia University is a private Roman Catholic university in Dallas, Pennsylvania.  It was founded by the Religious Sisters of Mercy in 1924 as College Misericordia; in 2007 it became a university and changed its name. The university offers bachelor's, master's and doctoral degrees as well as post-master's and post-bachelor's certificates. The university operates a campus in Pittsburgh, Pennsylvania where it offers an accelerated Bachelor of Science in Nursing program in partnership with Orbis Education.

History

The Religious Sisters of Mercy were of the order of Mercy founded in Dublin in 1831. The Sisters vowed to be of service to the impoverished, sick and uneducated. The Sisters of Mercy came to the Wyoming Valley area of Pennsylvania in 1875, continuing their mission of praying, teaching and caring for the sick. The sisters established a school for children and a night school for adults in the coal mining region.

More than 2,500 people witnessed the dedication of Misericordia (whose name means “heart of mercy”). That September, 37 students began their studies.

Misericordia continues to be as a university, a broad-based liberal arts and pre-professional studies institution offering education to those of all faiths. The university has been co-educational since the 1970s and offers graduate programs.

Prior to August 24, 2007, Misericordia operated as "College Misericordia." The institution began operations as Misericordia University on August 24, 2007.

Campus
Recently (2009–2021), numerous changes have been added to the campus:
 The Shakespeare Garden: Misericordia University features the only Shakespeare garden in northeast PA and won a 2011 Greening Award from the Pennsylvania Horticultural Society
 Pauly Friedman Art Gallery
 The College of Health Sciences - Passan Hall
 Insalaco Hal

 Metz Field House
 MacDowell Hall
 Frank M. and Dorothea Henry Science Center

Academics
Misericordia gives students a choice of 32 majors in three Academic Colleges:
 College of Arts and Science
 College of Health Sciences and Education
 College of Business

Environmental Studies
In the spring of 2020, the university announced it had received a grant from the National Endowment for the Humanities to establish an interdisciplinary BA program in environmental studies.

Guaranteed Placement Program
Misericordia's Guaranteed Placement Program (or GPP) is a development program pertaining to a student's education.

Established in 1999, the GPP assists students entering the workforce or graduate school after graduation. Students participate in the GPP for all four years of their college experience. If they do not receive a job offer or are not accepted into graduate/professional school within six months after graduation, the university gives them a paid internship in their chosen field.

BA to MA in English
Launched in September 2014, the Misericordia University/University of Reading BA to MA in English is a five-year program in which students complete a four-year Bachelor of Arts degree in English at Misericordia and a one-year Master of Arts degree in English Language and Literature at the University of Reading in the United Kingdom. Students may study for an MA in Children's Literature or English, including pathways in Renaissance studies, Victorian Literature and Culture, or Modern and Contemporary Writing.

Athletics
Misericordia University competes in the NCAA Division III, Eastern College Athletic Conference and the MAC Freedom within the Middle Atlantic Conferences. Women's sports include basketball, soccer, field hockey, volleyball, swimming, softball, cross-country, cheerleading, lacrosse, tennis and track and field. Men's sports include basketball, football, soccer, swimming, cross-country, baseball, golf, lacrosse, tennis, track and field, and volleyball.

The school has had an athletics program since 1932, when it introduced intramural sports.

Student life
Misericordia University has 41 clubs, service organizations and special interest organizations.

Special Organizations: Assistive Technology Research Institute; Diversity Institute; Ethics Institute of Northeast Pennsylvania; Institute of Gerontology (Aging Religious); Institute of Law and Religious Life; Institute of Sacred Scripture.

Special Programs: Alternative Learner's Project (ALP) for students who learn differently; Center for Service Learning; incorporating community service into academic study; Distance Learning Program, providing college level courses to students in the Northern Tier of Pennsylvania; Fun and Fitness Program, providing a variety of athletics and other activities for the community at the Anderson Sports-Health Center; Cultural Events, providing a variety of programs usually at no cost to the community. The Ruth Matthews Bourger Women with Children Program, a unique program that empowers economically disadvantaged single mothers by providing the opportunity to complete a college degree.

Student Government Association
Misericordia's Student Government Association is a student-run, student-elected executive board which represents the students at Misericordia University. Members of the board and delegates represent the students on various college committees. Student Government also is the governing body of the various clubs on campus and keeps records of each club's activities. The Student Government Association is made up of eight members.

English Department
Instress is the campus' annual literary magazine published each spring. It prints original material by students and members of the university community.

Notable alumni
 Karen Boback, member of the Pennsylvania House of Representatives
 Mike Dunleavy, Governor of Alaska
 Dave Kern, professional soccer player
 Maria Pallante, United States Register of Copyrights

Financial aid
The university participates in financial aid programs. These programs generate funds from Federal, State and College resources. Additional financial aid monies are contributed by alumni and friends of the university. The financial aid office packages aid from a combination of sources to meet indicated need.

References

External links
 Official website

 
Catholic universities and colleges in Pennsylvania
Sisters of Mercy colleges and universities
Educational institutions established in 1924
Association of Catholic Colleges and Universities
Universities and colleges in Luzerne County, Pennsylvania
Former women's universities and colleges in the United States
1924 establishments in Pennsylvania